Gardoty  is a village in the administrative district of Gmina Przytuły within Łomża County, Podlaskie Voivodeship, in north-eastern Poland.

References

Gardoty